Ojstrica is a mountain in the eastern part of the Kamnik Alps with a pyramid-shaped top that is visible from far away. The name Ojstrica derives from the Slovene word oster 'sharp'. The eastern side, down to the Roban Cirque, also has a high wall. There are several climbing routes.

Starting points 
 Kamnik, Kamniška Bistrica
 Solčava, Logar Valley
 Solčava, Roban Cirque

Routes
 1½h: from Kocbek Lodge at Korošica, on the southern side
 1½h: from Kocbek Lodge at Korošica, on the eastern side
 4h: from Kamnik Saddle Lodge, below Planjava via Škarje
 3½h: from Klemenšek Cave Lodge at Ojstrica, via Škarje
 3h: from Klemenšek Cave Lodge at Ojstrica, via Škrbina

External links
 Ojstrica on hribi.net Route Description and Photos (slo)
 Summitpost.org Ojstrica

Mountains of the Kamnik–Savinja Alps
Mountains of Styria (Slovenia)
Two-thousanders of Slovenia